"I Need Your Love" is a song by Scottish producer and DJ Calvin Harris from his third studio album, 18 Months (2012). The song features vocals from English singer Ellie Goulding and was released on 2 April 2013 as the album's seventh single. "I Need Your Love" is also included as a bonus track on Goulding's second studio album, Halcyon (2012). The accompanying music video, directed by Emil Nava, depicts Harris and Goulding as a romantic couple on a trip to Miami.

"I Need Your Love" received favourable reviews from critics. The song reached number four on the UK Singles Chart, making Harris the first artist in UK chart history to attain eight top-10 entries from one studio album. It also reached the top five in Australia, Austria, Finland, and Sweden, the top 10 in Belgium, Ireland and Switzerland, and the top 20 in the United States. At the 2014 Brit Awards, the song was nominated for British Single of the Year, while the music video was nominated for British Video of the Year.

Composition
Musically, it is written in the key of C minor and follows a chord progression of Cm—A—E—B. The song has a tempo of 125 beats per minute.

Critical reception
"I Need Your Love" received primarily positive reviews from music critics. Robert Copsey of Digital Spy rated the song four out of five stars, stating that "it's [Goulding's] distinctively soft-yet-throaty vocal that lifts it from the generic into something special." Sam Lansky of Idolator wrote that Goulding's "characteristically fragile, twee vocals [...] sound even more haunting in the context of Harris' futuristic electro instrumentation", adding that Harris is "in fine form here." Billboard commented that Goulding's "fragile voice carries so much warmth that no amount of synthetic clutter can dim a line like, 'Tell me, do you feel the same?/Hold me in your arms again'", but felt that "Harris' beat is a bit too strenuous here".

Commercial performance
Following the release of 18 Months, "I Need Your Love" debuted at number 85 on the UK Singles Chart and at number 58 on the Irish Singles Chart in early November 2012. The song re-entered the UK chart at number 75 during the week ending 17 March 2013, selling 3,256 copies. In its fourth week, the track jumped from number 41 to number 25 with 13,909 copies sold, becoming Harris's 16th top-40 single and Goulding's ninth. On 21 April 2013, when "I Need Your Love" jumped from number eleven to number seven with sales of 33,052 copies, Harris made chart history by becoming the first artist to achieve eight UK top-10 singles from one studio album, breaking the previous record of seven set by Michael Jackson's 1987 album Bad and subsequently equalled by 1991's Dangerous. The single jumped to its peak position of number four the following week, selling 43,971 copies. As of August 2013, "I Need Your Love" had sold 395,462 copies in the United Kingdom.

Since its debut, "I Need Your Love" peaked at number six on the Irish chart. The song debuted at number 44 on the ARIA Singles Chart for the week commencing 11 March 2013, peaking at number three in its eighth week on the chart. In New Zealand, it entered the RIANZ Singles Chart at number 26 and peaked at number 15 for two consecutive weeks.

In the United States, the song debuted at number 76 on the Billboard Hot 100 and peaked at number 16, becoming Harris's fifth top-40 single and Goulding's second. "I Need Your Love" had sold one million downloads in the United States as of September 2013.

Music videos
The music video for "I Need Your Love" was directed by Emil Nava and premiered on 14 April 2013. It shortens the track by omitting some of the intro music, starting immediately with Goulding's first lines.

The video starts with Goulding in bed, singing the song. She is joined by Harris, who is depicted to be in a romantic relationship with her. The video shifts to amateur-like footage of Goulding and Harris acting in an affectionate manner toward each other in different locations such as a resort, in a car, at a beach, and at a tattoo parlor. While the supposed "camcorder" is filming at a beach where Goulding and Harris once were, it gets picked up by individual who films himself skateboarding and later playing billiards. Shots of Goulding and Harris flash throughout the video, then it cuts back to the billiards scene, however the first individual is nowhere in sight, and instead a biker prepares the billiards table before seeing the camcorder and taking it, using it to film himself riding a motorcycle along a highway.

After this, the camcorder is picked up from the sidewalk by a third individual, who uses it to film a helicopter tour of Miami. Then, it is given to another individual jet skiing until he seems to lose the camcorder. Subsequently, the camcorder is found floating in water by a fifth individual who herself and another film each other on a boat cruise and later in a nightclub where Harris is performing as a DJ. Harris is then seen dancing with Goulding from afar. As the camera moves towards Harris, he reaches out and holds it, aiming the view at the nightclub's audience. Scenes of the music video flash back in rapid succession, leading to the ending of the video with Harris setting the camera down and getting into bed with Goulding in the same bedroom as at the beginning of the video.

The music video for "I Need Your Love" was nominated for Best Collaboration and Best Song of the Summer at the 2013 MTV Video Music Awards.

On 3 April 2015, an alternate music video for "I Need Your Love" was supposedly leaked online. This version of the video "has a darker theme. It centers mostly on Goulding as she wears an all-black outfit while singing alone in the middle of dim-lit place surrounded by fog." Throughout the video, it depicts a fight between two men; a young boy climbing a twisted tree that catches fire; a young girl screaming atop a boulder; a woman being hung in mid-air as it rains; a male carrying an unconscious woman to a mountain of candles; and Harris is seen walking around in the fog as well.

Track listings

Credits and personnel
Credits adapted from the liner notes of 18 Months.

Recording and management
 Recorded at Fly Eye Studio, London
 Mastered at The Exchange Mastering Studios, London
 Published by EMI Music Publishing / Global Publishing
 Ellie Goulding appears courtesy of Polydor Records, a division of Universal Music Operations Limited

Personnel
 Calvin Harris – production, all instruments
 Ellie Goulding – vocals
 Karen Thompson – mastering

Charts

Weekly charts

Year-end charts

Certifications

Release history

See also
 List of number-one dance singles of 2013 (U.S.)

References

2012 songs
2013 singles
Calvin Harris songs
Columbia Records singles
Ellie Goulding songs
Songs written by Calvin Harris
Songs written by Ellie Goulding